Dali District is an inner city district in Taichung, Taiwan.

Name
The name "Dali" originates from Tai-li-khit, where Tai-li refers to the Hoanya aborigines and khit refers to a bamboo raft's toon.

History
After the handover of Taiwan from Japan to the Republic of China in 1945, Dali was organized as a rural township of Taichung County. On 1 November 1993, Dali was upgraded to a county-administered city due to its population. On 25 December 2010, Taichung County was merged with Taichung City and Dali was upgraded to a district of the city.

Administrative divisions
Tunghu, Xihu, Dali, Xinli, Guoguang, Shuwang, Xiangxing, Neixin, Zhongxin, Tungsheng, Dayuan, Jiatian, Renhua, Rende, Jianmin, Tucheng, Tungxing, Daming, Yonglong, Rixin, Xirong, Zhangrong, Jincheng, Liren, Lide, Xinren and Ruicheng Village.

Education

Universities
 Hsiuping University of Science and Technology

Junior high schools
Cheng Kong Junior High School

Senior high schools
The Affiliated Senior High School of National Chung Hsing University
Taichung county of Dali senior High School
Ta ming senior High School
Chito tai senior High School
Youth senior High School
Lizen senior High School

Economy
Taichung Software Park
Dali Industrial Park

Tourist attractions
 Museum of Fiber Arts
 Taichung software park Dali art plaza
 Daliyi old street	
 Daliyifusinggong temple
 Mayfun Taro ice
Taichung City Dali Civil Sports Center

Transportation
NH3(209)
Provincial Highway No.3
Provincial Highway No.63
Provincial Highway No.74
County route No.129

Hospital
 Jen-Ai Hospital
 Bodhi Hospital
 Wufeng Cheng Ching Hospital

Districts of Taichung
2010 establishments in Taiwan
Taiwan placenames originating from Formosan languages